Dylan Alcott and David Wagner defeated Ymanitu Silva and Koji Sugeno in the final, 6–3, 6–3 to win the inaugural quad doubles wheelchair tennis title at the 2019 French Open. It was the second step towards an eventual Grand Slam for Alcott.

Draw

Finals

References

External links
 Draw

Wheelchair Quad Doubles
French Open, 2019 Quad Doubles